Dmitry Chudinov (born 15 September 1986) is a Russian professional boxer who held the WBA interim middleweight title from 2013 to 2015. His younger brother, Fedor Chudinov, is also a professional boxer.

Professional career 
Chudinov started his career with a first-round TKO of Otis Chennault at the Reno Events Center in Reno, Nevada. He defeated Juan Camilo Novoa on December 21, 2013 to win the WBA interim Middleweight title.

Professional boxing record 

|-
|align="center" colspan=8|31 fights; 21 wins (13 knockouts), 7 loss, 3 draws
|-
| align="center" style="border-style: none none solid solid; background: #e3e3e3"|Res.
| align="center" style="border-style: none none solid solid; background: #e3e3e3"|Record
| align="center" style="border-style: none none solid solid; background: #e3e3e3"|Opponent
| align="center" style="border-style: none none solid solid; background: #e3e3e3"|Type
| align="center" style="border-style: none none solid solid; background: #e3e3e3"|Rd., Time
| align="center" style="border-style: none none solid solid; background: #e3e3e3"|Date
| align="center" style="border-style: none none solid solid; background: #e3e3e3"|Location
| align="center" style="border-style: none none solid solid; background: #e3e3e3"|Notes
|- align=center
|Loss
|21–7–3
|align=left| Germaine Brown
|
|
|
|align=left|
|
|- align=center
|Loss
|21–6–3
|align=left| Louis Toutin
|
|
|
|align=left|
|
|- align=center
|style="background: #B0C4DE"|Draw
|21–5–3
|align=left| Armenak Hovhannisyan
|
|
|
|align=left|
|align=left|
|- align=center
|Loss
|21–5–2
|align=left| Robert Parzeczewski
|
|
|
|align=left|
|
|- align=center
|Loss
|21–4–2
|align=left| Patrick Mendy
|
|
|
|align=left|
|
|- align=center
|Loss
|21–3–2
|align=left| Azizbek Abdugofurov
|
|
|
|align=left|
|align=left|
|- align=center
|Win
|21–2–2
|align=left| Siarhei Khamitski
|
|
|
|align=left|
|align=left|
|- align=center
|Loss
|20–2–2
|align=left| Lolenga Mock
|
|
|
|align=left|
|align=left|
|- align=center
|Win
|20–1–2
|align=left| Zoltan Papp
|
|
|
|align=left|
|align=left|
|- align=center
|Win
|19–1–2
|align=left| Andrejs Pokumeiko
|
|
|
|align=left|
|align=left|
|- align=center
|Win
|18–1–2
|align=left| Marat Khuzeev
|
|
|
|align=left|
|align=left|
|- align=center
|Win
|17–1–2
|align=left| Benjamin Simon
|
|
|
|align=left|
|align=left|
|- align=center
|Win
|16–1–2
|align=left| Siarhei Krapshyla
|
|
|
|align=left|
|align=left|
|- align=center
|Win
|15–1–2
|align=left| Geard Ajetović
|
|
|
|align=left|
|align=left|
|- align=center
|Loss
|14–1–2
|align=left| Chris Eubank Jr.
|
|
|
|align=left|
|align=left|
|- align=center
|Win
|14–0–2
|align=left| Mehdi Bouadla
|
|
|
|align=left|
|align=left|
|- align=center
|Win
|13–0–2
|align=left| Patrick Nielsen
|
|
|
|align=left|
|align=left|
|- align=center
|Win
|12–0–2
|align=left| Juan Camilo Novoa
|
|
|
|align=left|
|align=left|
|- align=center
|Win
|11–0–2
|align=left| Max Maxwell
|
|
|
|align=left|
|align=left|
|-align=center
|Win
|10–0–2
|align=left| Jorge Navarro
|
| 
|
|align=left|
|align=left|
|-align=center
|style="background: #B0C4DE"|Draw
|9–0–2
|align=left| Patrick Mendy
|
|
|
|align=left|
|align=left|
|-align=center
|Win
|9–0–1
|align=left| Grady Brewer
|
|
|
|align=left|
|align=left|
|-align=center
|Win
|8–0–1
|align=left| Milton Núñez
|
|
|
|align=left|
|align=left|
|-align=center
|Win
|7–0–1
|align=left| Jhonatan Ricar
|
|
|
|align=left|
|align=left|
|-align=center
|style="background: #B0C4DE"|Draw
|6–0–1
|align=left| Paul Mendez
|
|
|
|align=left|
|align=left|
|-align=center
|Win
|6–0
|align=left| Tony Hirsch
|
|
|
|align=left|
|align=left|
|-align=center
|Win
|5–0
|align=left| Nathan Bedwell
|
|
|
|align=left|
|align=left|
|-align=center
|Win
|4–0
|align=left| Fernando Calleros
|
|
|
|align=left|
|align=left|
|-align=center
|Win
|3–0
|align=left| Flavio Cardoza
|
|
|
|align=left|
|align=left|
|-align=center
|Win
|2–0
|align=left| Eddie Hunter
|
|
|
|align=left|
|align=left|
|-align=center
|Win
|1–0
|align=left| Otis Chennault
|
|
|
|align=left|
|align=left|

References

External links
 

|-

1986 births
Living people
Russian male boxers
Middleweight boxers
People from Bratsk
Sportspeople from Irkutsk Oblast